Bogdan Marişca (born 5 March 1970 in Cluj-Napoca) is a rally driver from Romania. He made his rallying debut in 1993, driving a Dacia 1410. In 2000 and 2001 he won the Group N title in the Romanian Rally Championship driving a Mitsubishi Lancer. In 2005 he won the overall title in the same championship driving for Rally Team OMV. In 2007 he lost the title to Dan Gârtofan in the last event of the year after leading the championship for a long time.

External links
 Biografie şi palmares Bogdan Marişca

Romanian rally drivers
Sportspeople from Cluj-Napoca
1970 births
Living people